Ratan Tama (born 23 September 1946) is an Indian politician from Arunachal Pradesh belonging to the Indian National Congress.

He was Member of Rajya Sabha for the term, 27-5-1978 to 26-5-1984 from Arunachal Pradesh. He was Secretary of Janata Party during 1977-1978.

He is married with Shrimati Rotom Yak and had one daughter and three sons and resides at Raga in Lower Subansiri district, Arunachal Pradesh, India

References

Rajya Sabha members from Arunachal Pradesh
1946 births
Living people
People from Lower Subansiri district
Indian National Congress politicians
Janata Party politicians